Stenoma crypsetaera is a moth of the family Depressariidae. It is found in Amazonas, Brazil.

The wingspan is about 13 mm. The forewings are greyish fuscous and the second discal stigma is cloudy and dark fuscous. There are four minute whitish dots on the costa posteriorly. The hindwings are dark grey.

References

Moths described in 1925
Taxa named by Edward Meyrick
Stenoma